The 1944 season was the 14th completed season of Finnish Football League Championship, known as the Mestaruussarja.

Overview

The 1944 Mestaruussarja  was contested by 8 teams, with VIFK Vaasa winning the championship.

League table

Results

Footnotes

References

Mestaruussarja seasons
Fin
Fin
Mestaruussarja